West Branch High School is a public high school in Beloit, Ohio, United States. The high school was established in 1960  It is the only high school in the West Branch Local School District. Sports teams are called the Warriors, and they compete in the Ohio High School Athletic Association as a member of the Eastern Buckeye Conference.

History 
The high school was established in 1960

In June 2001, an outbreak of bacterial meningitis killed two high school students. A third student was hospitalized, but survived.

Athletics

OHSAA State Championships

 Football – 1994 
 Girls Basketball – 2004

1994 football championship
West Branch entered the playoffs with an undefeated record of 10-0 in the 1994 season and had clinched an NBC league title. West Branch won its first game against Copley by a score of 28-12. In the state semi-final game, the Warriors matched up against perennial powerhouse Steubenville Big Red. After a 21-7 deficit in the first half, the Warriors charged back with 3 consecutive touchdowns leading them to a 31-28 victory and a berth in the state finals. The state finals paired the Warriors against Clyde. West Branch won by a score of 28-11, giving the Northeastern Buckeye Conference its only football state title and West Branch its first state title in Division 3 football.

Rivalry with Salem 
The reason can be traced back to before 1971, when West Branch, without a field at the school, was forced to use Salem's field a home field. Due to this, the games played there were usually intense, and very emotional for the players involved.

The construction of Clinton Heacock Stadium in 1971 allowed West Branch to play at its own field. However, the rivalry continued to be fierce, with occasional fan fights breaking out.

In 1994, perhaps the best game of the rivalry was played at Salem. At the end of regulation, the score was tied at 21-21. However, West Branch managed to pull off a stunning 28-21 victory in overtime. This win, coupled with a perfect regular season, started a run through the playoffs which ultimately led to a state championship.

In 1996, the fighting after the game caused by fans was so intense that the rivalry was called off for two years. In 1998, the rivalry was resumed, with Salem pulling a stunning victory over the Warriors. This win was the last for them until 2005.

The most recent game in 2021 ended in a 43-42 overtime victory over the Quakers, securing a perfect 10-0 regular season for the Warriors

Salem joined West Branch in the Northeastern Buckeye Conference for the 2011-12 school year, and both schools helped create the Eastern Buckeye Conference in 2018. This both guarantees and expands the rivalry as the Quakers and Warriors will meet yearly in all sports.

References

External links
 School website
 District website

High schools in Mahoning County, Ohio
Public high schools in Ohio